Bonnet Hill is a residential locality in the local government area (LGA) of Kingborough in the Hobart LGA region of Tasmania. The 2016 census recorded a population of 505 for the state suburb of Bonnet Hill.

It is also a massive hill of the greater Hobart area. The suburb, on the hill of the same name, overlooks Kingston. Bonnet Hill is a popular cycling route. Located on it is the famous Shot Tower. The sides of the hill are riddled with small paths mostly leading to the nearby Kingston Beach.

History 
Bonnet Hill was gazetted as a locality in 1960.

Geography
The waters of the River Derwent estuary form the eastern and south-eastern boundaries.

Road infrastructure
Route B68 (Channel Highway) runs through from north to west.

References

Localities of Kingborough Council